The Alberta Junior Hockey League (AJHL) is an Alberta-based Junior A ice hockey league that belongs to the Canadian Junior Hockey League (CJHL).  It was formed as a five-team league in 1964.  There are currently 16 teams in the league.  The regular season league champions receive the Dave Duchak Trophy.  The playoff champions receive the Inter Pipeline Cup (previously known as the Carling O'Keefe trophy and Gas Drive Cup). The winner of the AJHL playoffs continues on to play in the Doyle Cup series, which determines the Pacific region berth in the national Junior A championship, the Centennial Cup.

History
The early 1960s saw a much different junior hockey scene in Alberta than what currently exists.  The Edmonton Oil Kings were the only true Junior-A-calibre team in the province and drew most of the top talent Alberta had to offer.  The Oil Kings were the Western Canadian champions from 1962 until 1966, Abbott Cup champions in 1954 and from 1960 to 1966, and Memorial Cup national champions in 1963 and 1966.  In 1966, the Oil Kings helped create the Western Hockey League.  The issue in 1964 was that there were hundreds of junior-calibre players in the province, but really only one team to play for.  A group of business and hockey people got together in 1964 and decided to form a Junior "A" league in an attempt to truly develop Alberta hockey.  The original league consisted of the Edmonton Safeway Canadians, the Edmonton Maple Leafs, the Lethbridge Sugar Kings, Calgary Cowboys, and the Calgary Buffaloes.

The Edmonton Safeway Canadians and Maple Leafs later merged in 1971 to become the Edmonton Mets, then moved to Spruce Grove to become the Spruce Grove Mets in 1974.  They lasted only three seasons in Spruce Grove; however, they won the AJHL title twice, and the Manitoba Centennial Trophy in 1975. In 1976, they moved again to become the St. Albert Saints, where they won three more league titles.  In 2004, the team returned to Spruce Grove as the Spruce Grove Saints.  This well-travelled franchise has sent over 30 players into the National Hockey League, including Hockey Hall of Famer Mark Messier.

One of the AJHL's most famous franchises, the Red Deer Rustlers, joined the league in 1967, capturing the championship in their first season.  The Rustlers had attempted to join the Western Canada Junior Hockey League, but were blocked by the Alberta Amateur Hockey Association, and instead placed in the AJHL.  In 1971, the Rustlers captured the first Manitoba Centennial Trophy as national Junior A champions.  The Rustlers, who featured all six Sutter brothers who would go on to the National Hockey League, won eight AJHL titles and two Centennial Trophies during their existence.  They were expelled from the league, however, in 1989, and formally folded in 1992 when the Red Deer Rebels joined the WHL.

In 1971, the Calgary Canucks were founded following the demise of the Cowboys and Buffaloes.  Today, the Canucks are the oldest franchise still operating in the AJHL. It was founded with a mandate to focus on giving Calgary-area kids a place to play while focusing on their educational needs. The Canucks have captured a league record nine AJHL championships and won the Centennial Cup in 1995, the Canadian Championship of Junior A hockey, now known as the Royal Bank Cup.

After a game on February 21, 1980, the AJHL was shaken by a tragedy.  Twenty-year-old Trevor Elton, Captain of the Sherwood Park Crusaders was hit cleanly along the boards by a player on the St. Albert Saints in St. Albert, Alberta.  Elton landed and went into convulsions and died later that night while in hospital.

On November 26, 2010, the Fort McMurray Oil Barons and Drayton Valley Thunder played the first ever modern era regulation outdoor junior hockey game at MacDonald Island in Fort McMurray.  The game was known as the "Northern Classic". The 5,000 tickets available for the game sold out in less than an hour, and consequently broke the league attendance record of 4,400.  The current attendance record was set in 2017 as 5,989 fans watched the Okotoks Oilers and Spruce Grove Saints play the last game at Northlands Coliseum.

On May 2, 2012, the AJHL announced its approval of a request from the St. Albert Steel to relocate the team from St. Albert to Whitecourt to become the Whitecourt Wolverines.

Current teams

Future teams 
Formerly the Calgary Mustangs, which went on hiatus in 2019, the Blackfalds Bulldogs will commence play out of the Blackfalds Multiplex in the Town of Blackfalds in the AJHL's South Division in the 2021–2022 season.

National Junior A Championships
Teams from the AJHL have captured the Centennial Cup nine times. The Canadian Junior A championship was known as the Manitoba Centennial Trophy until 1995 and the Royal Bank/RBC Cup from 1995 to 2019.
 1971: Red Deer Rustlers
 1975: Spruce Grove Mets
 1980: Red Deer Rustlers
 1994: Olds Grizzlys
 1995: Calgary Canucks
 2000: Fort McMurray Oil Barons
 2001: Camrose Kodiaks
 2013: Brooks Bandits
 2019: Brooks Bandits

Playoff champions

The playoff championship cup was originally known as Carling O'Keefe Cup before it began going by several other sponsored names:
 Carling O'Keefe Cup was presented 1965–1997
 Rogers Wireless Cup presented 1998–2007
 Enerflex Cup presented 2008–2012
 Gas Drive Cup presented 2013–2017
 Inter Pipeline Cup presented 2018–present

The winners of the AJHL playoffs then advance to the Doyle Cup against the playoff champion of the British Columbia Hockey League. The winner of the Doyle Cup then advances to the National Junior A Championship, previously known as the Royal Bank Cup and RBC Cup. From 2013 to 2017, instead of the Doyle Cup to qualify to the National Championship, the AJHL playoff winner participated in the Western Canada Cup.

Timeline of teams in the AJHL
 1964 – Alberta Junior Hockey League is founded with: Edmonton Safeway Canadians, Edmonton Maple Leafs, Lethbridge Sugar Kings, Calgary Cowboys and Calgary Buffaloes.
 1965 – Edmonton Canadians renamed Edmonton Western Movers
 1967 – Red Deer Rustlers join league
 1971 – Calgary Canucks join league
 1972 – The Pass Red Devils join league
 1972 – Edmonton Maple Leafs and Edmonton Western Movers merge, renamed Edmonton Mets
 1974 – Edmonton Mets relocate to Spruce Grove and become the Spruce Grove Mets
 1974 – Taber Golden Suns join league
 1976 – Edmonton Crusaders join league
 1976 – Fort Saskatchewan Traders join league
 1976 – The Pass Red Devils relocate to Pincher Creek and become the Pincher Creek Panthers
 1977 – Spruce Grove Mets relocate to St. Albert and become the St. Albert Saints
 1978 – Edmonton Crusaders relocate to Sherwood Park and become the Sherwood Park Crusaders
 1978 – Pincher Creek Panthers relocate to Calgary and become the Calgary Chinooks
 1979 – Calgary Chinooks become the Calgary Spurs
 1981 – Fort McMurray Oil Barons and Hobbema Hawks join league
 1981 – Taber Golden Suns relocate to Olds and become the Olds Grizzlys
 1988 – Lloydminster Lancers of the Saskatchewan Junior Hockey League join league as Lloydminster Blazers
 1989 – Red Deer Rustlers expelled from league after bi-law violations
 1990 – Calgary Spurs become the Calgary Royals
 1990 – Hobbema Hawks take leave of absence
 1991 – Bonnyville Pontiacs join league
 1993 – Hobbema Hawks cease operations
 1995 – Bow Valley Eagles join league
 1996 – Grande Prairie Storm join league from the Rocky Mountain Junior Hockey League
 1997 – Camrose Kodiaks join league
 1998 – Drayton Valley Thunder join league
 1998 – Crowsnest Pass Timberwolves join league
 2000 – Brooks Bandits join league
 2001 – Bow Valley Eagles become Canmore Eagles
 2003 – Drumheller Dragons join league
 2004 – St. Albert Saints return to Spruce Grove and become the Spruce Grove Saints
 2005 – Lloydminster Blazers become Lloydminster Bobcats
 2005 – Crowsnest Pass Timberwolves relocate to Okotoks and become the Okotoks Oilers
 2007 – Fort Saskatchewan Traders relocate to St. Albert and become the St. Albert Steel
 2010 – Calgary Royals become the Calgary Mustangs
 2012 – St. Albert Steel relocate to Whitecourt and become the Whitecourt Wolverines
 2019 – Calgary Mustangs go on hiatus
 2019 -  Calgary Mustangs relocate to Blackfalds and become the Blackfalds Bulldogs

NHL alumni
As of 2006, nearly 200 AJHL alumni have gone on to play in the National Hockey League. Among them:

 Craig Adams
 Dave Babych
 Stu Barnes
 Bob Bassen
 Jay Beagle
 Dan Blackburn
 Mike Commodore
 Mike Comrie
 John Davidson
 Brennan Evans
 Rob Flockhart
 Curtis Glencross
 Kevin Haller
 Scott Hartnell
 Dany Heatley
 Cale Hulse
 Corey Hirsch
 Braden Holtby
 Chad Johnson
 Kelly Kisio
 Mark Letestu
 Clarke MacArthur
 Cale Makar
 Clint Malarchuk
 Richard Matvichuk
 Lanny McDonald
 Mark Messier
 Randy Moller
 Troy Murray
 Dana Murzyn
 Mike Needham
 Jim Nill
 Colton Parayko
 Chris Phillips
 Fernando Pisani
 Nolan Pratt
 Mason Raymond
 Wade Redden
 Steven Reinprecht
 Carter Rowney
 Lindy Ruff
 Ben Scrivens
 Geoff Smith
 Jason Smith
 Sheldon Souray
 Brent Sutter
 Brian Sutter
 Darryl Sutter
 Duane Sutter
 Rich Sutter
 Ron Sutter
 Ken Sutton
 Garry Unger
 Scottie Upshall
 Garry Valk
 Mike Vernon
 Stan Weir
 Craig Weller
 Glen Wesley
 Zarley Zalapski

References

External links
 AJHL official website

 
A
Canadian Junior Hockey League members